Bothnia or Bothnian may refer to:
 Gulf of Bothnia, a gulf of the Baltic Sea between Sweden and Finland
Bothnian Bay, the northernmost waters of the gulf
Bothnian Sea, the southernmost waters of the gulf
 Provinces in Sweden and Finland named after the gulf:
Ostrobothnia (disambiguation), multiple entities
West Bothnia, located west of the gulf
North Bothnia, located northwest of the gulf
 "Rear Bothnia", or Peräpohjola, southern part of Finnish Lapland
 SS Bothnia, transatlantic steamship (1874–99)
 Bothnia Line, high speed railway in northern Sweden
 Bothnian Highway, a main road between Kaskinen and Seinäjoki

Similar spellings
 Bosnia
 Boothia (disambiguation)
 Botany Bay